Pusionella compacta is a species of sea snail, a marine gastropod mollusk in the family Clavatulidae.

Description
The shell grows to a length of 26 mm.

(Original description) This form differs from the group of Clavatula milleti (synonym: Pusionella milleti) in her characteristic feature of the sculpture: the continuous vertical spiral suture is missing. They occur only up to the 7th whorl yet and then disappear completely, and as otherwise deviations also occur, so this form must be singled out. The compact spire contains 11–12 whorls. These are slightly rounded and convex. The aperture is the same as in Clavatula milleti. The callus at the anal sinus stands out clearly.

Distribution
This species occurs in the Atlantic Ocean off West Africa and Angola.

References

External links
 
 Specimen in the MNHN, Paris

compacta
Gastropods described in 1914